Founded in 2000, Heroic Television is a television production and development company consisting of John May and Suzanne Bolch.

The company produces children's television series for live action, animation and all the in between. Their shows have aired on YTV, Family Channel, ABC3, CBC, BBC Kids and the Disney Channel in Canada; and dozens of others around the world.

This company was previously Heroic Film Company, in 2000, by John May, Karen Lee Hall and Suzanne Bolch. The first production was the award winning sitcom Our Hero. Since, "'Heroic Television'" has won numerous awards, from the Writers Guild of Canada, The Alliance for Children and Television, Gemini Awards, Kidscreen, Youth Media Alliance and the Directors Guild of Canada.

Productions

Cancelled

References

External links 
 Official Website

Television production companies of Canada